Yielima is a locality in northern Victoria, Australia in the local government area of the Shire of Moira.

The New South Wales border is to the north of the locality.

References

Towns in Victoria (Australia)
Shire of Moira